
Gmina Bojadła is a rural gmina (administrative district) in Zielona Góra County, Lubusz Voivodeship, in western Poland.

Villages
Gmina Bojadła contains the villages and settlements of Bełcze, Bojadła, Karczemka, Kartno, Klenica, Kliniczki, Młynkowo, Pólko, Przewóz, Pyrnik, Siadcza, Sosnówka, Susłów and Wirówek.

Neighbouring gminas
Gmina Bojadła is bordered by the gminas of Kargowa, Kolsko, Nowa Sól, Otyń, Trzebiechów and Zabór.

References

Bojadla
Zielona Góra County